Jung Joon-won (born 26 July 2004) is a  South Korean actor.

Filmography

Television series

Film

Awards and nominations

References

External links 
 
 

2004 births
Living people
South Korean male television actors
South Korean male film actors
People from Gimhae